A referendum on animal protection was held in Switzerland on 20 August 1893. Voters were asked whether they approved of prohibiting butchering without the animals being anaesthetised. The proposal was approved by 60.1% of voters and a narrow majority of cantons.

Background
The referendum was a popular initiative, forced by the collection of 100,000 signatures. As it involved changing the constitution, a double majority of both votes and cantons was required for the proposal to pass.

Results

References

Switzerland
1893 in Switzerland
Antisemitism in Switzerland
Halal meat
Islam in Switzerland
Jewish Swiss history
Kosher meat
Referendums in Switzerland
Ritual slaughter